Omoedus is a genus of jumping spiders (family Salticidae).

Taxonomy
Omoedus was first described by Tamerlan Thorell in 1881. In 2015, Junxia Zhang and Wayne Maddison synonymized Pystira with Omoedus, but this was rejected by rejected by Jerzy Prószyński in 2017, and both genera are accepted by the World Spider Catalog .

The genus is placed in the subfamily Salticinae, tribe Euophryini.

Species
 it contains seven species, found on Fiji, in Papua New Guinea, on the Aru Islands, and the Moluccas:
Omoedus cordatus Berry, Beatty & Prószyński, 1996 – Fiji
Omoedus insultans (Thorell, 1881) – New Guinea
Omoedus kulczynskii Prószyński, 1971 – New Guinea
Omoedus niger Thorell, 1881 (type) – New Guinea
Omoedus piceus Simon, 1902 – Indonesia (Moluccas), New Guinea
Omoedus sexualis (Strand, 1911) – Indonesia (Aru Is.)
Omoedus torquatus (Simon, 1902) – Indonesia (Moluccas)

References

Salticidae genera
Salticidae
Spiders of Oceania
Taxa named by Tamerlan Thorell